Robin G. "Rob" Kreibich (born June 4, 1959) is an American businessman and Republican politician.  He served 14 years in the Wisconsin State Assembly (1993–2007), representing Eau Claire County.

Biography
Born in Wabasha, Minnesota, he graduated from University of Minnesota in 1982 and went to Brown Institute. He was a former television anchorman. He served in the Wisconsin State Assembly from 1993 until he was defeated for reelection in 2006 by Democrat Jeff Smith.  Since leaving office, Kreibach has worked in marketing for the Marshfield Clinic and is now executive director of the New Richmond Chamber of Commerce.

References

External links
 
 Official website at Wisconsin Legislature (Archived November 10, 2006)

1959 births
Living people
Republican Party members of the Wisconsin State Assembly
People from Wabasha, Minnesota
University of Minnesota alumni
21st-century American politicians